The Salish Star is a fireboat operated by the city of Bellingham, Washington. The vessel cost approximately $1 million. The Department of Homeland Security supplied three quarters of the cost through a FEMA Port Security Grant. The Port of Bellingham and the city of Bellingham provided the remainder.

The Salish Star replaced the Fire Belle, a smaller, slower, less-capable fireboat. Her pumps can throw , while the older vessel could only project . She is powered by a pair of  diesel engines.

The Salish Star is equipped with a modern suite of high-tech sensors, including infrared sensors that both help find fires' hotspots and also locate the survivors of maritime disasters.

References

Fireboats of Washington (state)